Michaja Nicolaï (born 7 March 1996), known professionally as Mia Nicolai, is a Dutch singer, songwriter and actress. She is set to represent the Netherlands in the Eurovision Song Contest 2023 alongside Dion Cooper with the song "Burning Daylight".

Early life 
Nicolaï was born on 7 March 1996 in Amsterdam as the second daughter of lawyer and Party for the Animals politician Peter Nicolaï and Russian-born musician and composer Marynka Nicolaï-Krylova. She started taking drama and ballet classes at the age of three. According to Nicolaï, this sparked an interest in music, which would eventually lead to her taking piano and violin lessons.

Career

2018–2022: First singles 
In 2018, Nicolaï released her first single, a cover of American composer Glenn Miller's "At Last". In 2020, she released "Set Me Free" and "Mutual Needs", the latter of which was featured on DJ Zane Lowe's radio show. In 2021, she released two singles, "People Pleaser" and "Dream Go".

2023: Eurovision Song Contest 
On 1 November 2022, the Dutch broadcaster AVROTROS announced that Nicolaï would represent the Netherlands in the Eurovision Song Contest 2023, alongside Dion Cooper. Nicolaï had met Cooper in 2020 when fellow Dutch Eurovision entrant and winner of the 2019 edition, Duncan Laurence, along with Laurence's partner Jordan Garfield, paired the two up.

Personal life and artistry 
Nicolaï has lived in London, Melbourne and New York City, before settling in Los Angeles in 2022. She has cited English singer David Bowie as one of her main artistic influences.

Discography

Singles

References

External links 
 

Living people
21st-century Dutch women singers
21st-century Dutch singers
Dutch expatriates in the United States
Dutch people of Russian descent
Dutch women singer-songwriters
Eurovision Song Contest entrants for the Netherlands
Eurovision Song Contest entrants of 2023
Musicians from Amsterdam
1996 births